Ssamjang is a thick, spicy paste used with food wrapped in a leaf in Korean cuisine. The sauce is made of fermented soy beans (doenjang), red chili paste (gochujang), sesame oil, onion, garlic, green onions, and optionally brown sugar.

Use
Ssamjang is usually eaten with a ssam of grilled meat. One typically puts a leaf of lettuce or perilla on an open hand, places the main components of the meal (grilled meat such as galbi or samgyeopsal, kimchi and other banchan, rice if desired) in bite-size pieces in the center, tops it off with ssamjang, wraps the leaf around the entire contents, and then eats the wrapped ssam. It is also served as a dip with peppers.

Etymology
Ssam means "wrapped" and jang means "paste" or "thick sauce". Together as ssamjang they mean "wrapping sauce".

Variations
Besides the standard way of making ssamjang, other ingredients can be added to make special versions. There are also commercially prepacked ssamjang available on the market.
Nut ssamjang (견과류 쌈장): ground walnuts, pumpkin seeds, sunflower seeds, and other nuts are added
Jjukumi ssamjang (쭈꾸미 쌈장): diced short-arm octopus is stir-fried with diced red peppers and onions, and mixed together with ssamjang
Tofu ssamjang (두부 쌈장): crushed tofu is added
Flying fish roe ssamjang (날치알 쌈장) : flying fish roe is added
Namul ssamjang (나물 쌈장): various beans are diced and added
River snail ssamjang (우렁이 쌈장): Boil the water with doenjang, river snail, green onion, garlic, and red pepper powder.

See also
Fermented bean paste
Korean cuisine

References

Fermented foods
Korean condiments
Food paste